The Moholy-Nagy University of Art and Design (in Hungarian: Moholy-Nagy Művészeti Egyetem, MOME), former Hungarian University of Arts and Design, is located in Budapest, Hungary. Named after László Moholy-Nagy, the university offers programs in art, architecture, designer and visual communication.

History

The predecessor of the Moholy-Nagy University of Art and Design, the Hungarian Royal National School of Arts and Crafts, was founded in 1880 and operated under this name until 1944. Like other European Art Colleges, it evolved from a handicraft industry school, the Model Drawing School. Its founder and first director, Gusztáv Kelety declared the ‘educational support of a more artistic wood and furniture industry’ the aim of the new institution. The spirit of the school was fundamentally influenced by the Arts and Crafts Movement of Britain, as well as by Hungarian folklore.

At first there was only one department, in which architectural drawing and design were taught. Goldsmithing and xylography classes started in 1883, while decorative painting and copperplate engraving classes began in 1884. The decorative sculpture class, uniting small sculpture and wood-carving, was established in 1885. In 1896, the school, which had been scattered in different parts of Budapest, moved to the new Museum of Applied Arts, and came under the directorship of Kamill Flitter. The number of registered students at that time was 120.

The idea of converting the school into a college arose in the early 1940s, but the rigours of the war years prevented any steps from being taken. Following the repair of damage suffered in the Second World War, teaching resumed in March 1945, and preparations to reorganise the school continued. In 1946 the ministry decided to elevate the school’s rank; thus the College of Arts and Crafts was established.

In 1950 there were already six degree courses, and the number of students in 1952 rose to 280. In 1954 parts of the College moved to the present location in Zugligeti Street, but some of the workshops remained in the Kinizsi Street annex of the Museum of Applied Arts. In 1955 another reorganisation occurred: with the termination of the theatre stage design course, four degree courses remained: interior decoration, decorative painting, decorative sculpture and textile design. The industrial design degree course was initiated in 1959.

The appointment of Frigyes Pogány to the head of the College in 1964 ushered in a new era of reforms, coinciding with the growing appreciation of the social role of applied arts. In 1971 the College was granted university rank, but remained a college in name. In 1982, under István Gergely, a new series of reforms were introduced: the departments were changed into institutes, allowing students to earn college and university degrees in the incremental educational system. In the mid-1980s, the range of courses was extended with the establishment of photography, video and art management courses. The official gallery of the College, Tölgyfa Galéra, opened its doors to the public in Henger Street in 1987. With the appointment of the renowned ceramic artist  to the head of the College, uniform university training was introduced, and the departments were re-established. In 1997, because of economic restrictions, the structure of the institution was modified again.

The university was accredited in 1998.

Since 1999, textile designer Judit Droppa has served as president of the university. In 2002 a far-reaching development plan was devised, the first phase calling for the removal of the Tölgyfa Gallery from Henger Street and the renovation of the main building of the university in the same year. The current rector of the university is József Fülöp.

In March 2006 the Hungarian University of Arts and Design announced its new name as Moholy-Nagy University of Art and Design.

Departments

Architecture
Product Design
Silicate Design
Textile Design
Media (graphic design, media design, animation, photography)

Others:
Teacher Training
Manager Training
Doctoral Studies

Notable faculty and alumni

Sándor Bortnyik
László Moholy-Nagy
István Orosz
Gábor Megyeri
Ernő Rubik, the inventor of Rubik's Cube.

See also

External links
  (Hungarian and English)
 Cumulus page (English)
 Aerial photography of the building

References

 
1880 establishments in Hungary
Educational institutions established in 1880